Adam Mark Crookes (born 18 November 1997) is an English professional footballer who plays as a defender for  club York City.

A graduate of the Nottingham Forest Academy, he captained the under-18's to the Professional Development League 2 title in the 2015–16 season. He spent part of the 2017–18 campaign on loan at Guiseley and was loaned out to Lincoln City and Port Vale the following season, before joining Vale permanently on a two-year contract in May 2019. He signed with Grimsby Town in July 2021 and moved on to York City in June 2022.

Early and personal life
Born in Lincoln, Crookes attended Priory City of Lincoln Academy. His agent is Phil Sproson.

Career

Nottingham Forest
Crookes began his career with St. Helen's and Navenby, before signing for Nottingham Forest at the age of eight. He captained Forest's under-18 team to the Professional Development U18 League 2 title and the fifth round of the FA Youth Cup in the 2015–16 season. In an interview with the Nottingham Post in November 2017, he said that "I thought I've been playing quite strongly and hopefully I can push on, and maybe the gaffer (Mark Warburton) is going to have a look at me. If not, I'll look to go on loan." He moved on loan to struggling National League side Guiseley the following month. He made his senior debut on 20 December, in a 2–1 defeat at Gateshead in the FA Trophy. He made his league debut at Nethermoor Park three days later in a 1–1 draw with Aldershot Town. Having established himself in the first-team for Paul Cox's "Lions", the loan was later extended until the end of the 2017–18 season. However he was recalled by Forest manager Aitor Karanka in March 2018, after making 16 appearances.

He moved on loan to his hometown club, Lincoln City, in August 2018, after impressing manager Danny Cowley on trial. He made his debut in the EFL Cup on 28 August, as the "Imps" fell to a 4–1 defeat at Championship side Blackburn Rovers. However he failed to break into the first-team for the League Two leaders and was recalled to the City Ground in January 2019, having made only four further EFL Trophy appearances at Sincil Bank.

Port Vale
On 14 January 2019, Crookes joined struggling League Two side Port Vale on loan for the remainder of the 2018–19 season. Manager Neil Aspin state that "A natural left-footer in the defence is something we've not had and he'll compete for a place". He made his debut in the English Football League in a 1–0 win at Crawley Town on 19 January. He maintained his first-team place under new manager John Askey, impressing both playing on the left of a back three and at left-back in a back four. Assistant manager Dave Kevan said that Crookes had good character and that the management team would monitor his availability in the summer. Crookes was released by Nottingham Forest on 13 May 2019, though his agent Phil Sproson revealed that he had received contract offers from Vale and another, unnamed club. He signed a two-year deal with Port Vale on 31 May.

He began the 2019–20 season playing at left-back and said that he had been studying Liverpool full-back Andrew Robertson to improve his performance in the role. He maintained his first-team place until a "freakish training accident" saw him sidelined in late-October. He returned to training after a four-month layoff, but was unable to add to his 17 starts before the season was ended early due to the COVID-19 pandemic in England.

He struggled for playing time at the start of the 2020–21 season as he was behind centre-backs Nathan Smith, Leon Legge and Shaun Brisley in the pecking order, though impressed the management after filling in at left-back in the absence of Cristian Montaño and David Fitzpatrick. He scored his first goal in professional football on 30 January, in a 5–1 home win over Southend United. He started new manager Darrell Clarke's first two games in charge, playing left-back in a 4–4–2 and then left-sided centre-back in a 3–5–2 formation. However he was one of 15 players released at the end of the season.

Grimsby Town
He signed a one-year contract with National League club Grimsby Town on 9 July 2021; manager Paul Hurst said he had been aware of Crookes for some time and that former manager Clarke had spoken well of him. He played 24 league games in the 2021–22 campaign, helping the "Mariners" to qualify for the play-offs with a sixth-place finish. Grimsby secured promotion with victory in the play-off final, though Crookes was not in the matchday squad at London Stadium. On 11 June, the club announced their retained list and confirmed that Crookes would be released upon the expiry of his contract at the end of the month.

York City
On 30 June 2022, Crookes joined newly-promoted National League club York City, alongside Grimsby teammate Scott Burgess, both of whom had played under York manager John Askey at Port Vale.

Playing style
Crookes has been described as "a left-sided defender equally comfortable playing left-sided centre back or at left back [who] can also play as a defensive midfielder if required".

Career statistics

Honours
Nottingham Forest
Professional Development League 2: 2015–16

References

1997 births
Living people
Sportspeople from Lincoln, England
English footballers
Association football defenders
Nottingham Forest F.C. players
Guiseley A.F.C. players
Lincoln City F.C. players
Port Vale F.C. players
Grimsby Town F.C. players
York City F.C. players
National League (English football) players
English Football League players